The Besa machine gun was a British version of the Czechoslovak ZB-53 air-cooled, belt-fed machine gun (called the TK vz. 37 in the Czechoslovak army).

The name came from the Birmingham Small Arms Company (BSA), who signed an agreement with Československá zbrojovka to manufacture the gun in the UK. The War Office ordered the weapon in 1938 and production began in 1939, after modifications.

It was used extensively by the armed forces of United Kingdom during the Second World War as a mounted machine gun for tanks and other armoured vehicles as a replacement for the heavier, water-cooled Vickers machine gun. Although it required a rather large opening in the tank's armour, it was reliable.

Development and use

Although British forces used the .303 in rimmed round for rifles and machine guns, the ZB-53 had been designed for the German 7.92×57mm Mauser round; referred to by the British as the 7.92 mm. The British had intended to move from rimmed to rimless ammunition but with war imminent, wholesale change was not possible. It was considered by BSA and the Ministry of Supply that the industrial, technical and supply difficulty of converting the design to the .303 round would be more onerous than retaining the original calibre, especially given that the chain of supply for the Royal Armoured Corps was already separate from the other fighting arms of the British Army and the round was not changed for British production. Since the Besa used the same ammunition as Germany used in its rifles and machine guns, the British could use stocks of captured enemy ammunition, albeit without the ability to use their ammunition belts as packaged.  While American-produced armoured cars or tanks would have been fitted with .30 cal Browning machine guns, many British tanks and armoured cars were equipped with the Besa machine gun fed from non-disintegrating disposable 225-round steel metal-link belts.

The Mark II version entered service in June 1940, modified with a selector to give a high rate of fire (750–850 rounds per minute) for close combat or focused targets or a low rate of fire (450–550 rounds per minute) for long-range combat or area targets. The design was modified to be more rapidly and economically produced and three simplified models, the Mark II*, Mark III and Mark III*, entered service in August 1943. The Mark II* was a transitional model designed to use the new simplified parts but was compatible with the Mark II. The Mark III and Mark III* versions did away with the rate selector and had simplified parts like the Mark II* but were incompatible with the Mark II. The Mark III had a fixed high rate of fire (750–850 rpm) and the Mark III* had a fixed low rate of fire (450–550 rpm)

The earlier wartime Mark I, Mark II and Mark II* versions of the Besa 7.92 mm were declared obsolete in 1951 and all Mark III versions were converted to Mark III*. The Mark III/2 introduced in 1952 was a conversion of the Mark III* with a new bracket and body cover. The later Mark III/3 introduced in 1954 was a conversion of the Mark III/2 that replaced the barrel and sleeve and made the gas vents larger on the gas cylinder to make it easier to use belts of mixed ammunition. The post-war Mark III/2 and Mark III/3 remained in service until the late 1960s.

15 mm Besa machine gun

A larger, heavier – at  – 15 mm version (also belt-fed) was developed by BSA from the Czechoslovak ZB-60 heavy machine gun as vehicle armament. It could be fired in semi-automatic mode as well as fully automatic. It was introduced in British service in June 1940 and was used on the Light Tank Mk VIC and on armoured cars such as the Humber Armoured Car Marks I–III. Over 3,200 15 mm Besa were manufactured until it was declared obsolete in 1949. The 15 mm Besa was fed from 25-round metal belts, which limited its practical rate of fire, although the weapon was usually used for single shots as it was difficult to fire accurately in automatic.

See also 
 Bren gun – another ZB design taken up by the UK

References
Notes

Citations

Bibliography
 The ZB-53, heavy machine gun model 37 – in Czech
 Tanks equipment page Accessed 29 November 2007
 David Boyd Other British Tank Armaments  wwiiequipment.com 1 January 2009

External links

 https://web.archive.org/web/20120322211957/http://www.churchilltank.com/Home_Page/THE_BESA_MACHINE_GUN.html
 http://en.valka.cz/viewtopic.php/t/32150
 https://web.archive.org/web/20160304051457/http://www.municion.org/15/15x104Besa.htm
 15х104 Vz.38/Варианты

7.92×57mm Mauser machine guns
Machine guns of the United Kingdom
Medium machine guns
Tank guns
World War II machine guns
World War II weapons of the United Kingdom
Czechoslovakia–United Kingdom relations